For the Native language! was a political party in Latvia. The party's leader was Vladimir Linderman.

History
In 2009, Latvian national-bolsheviks established the political party "The 13 January Movement". In 2011 Linderman was co-founder of an NGO called Native Language and initiated constitutional referendum in Latvia. In 2011, the "13 January Movement" joined forces with Osipovs Party. On 16 July 2012, The Register of Enterprises officially registered the political party "For the Native Language!". In February 2016, a court decision to dissolve the party was upheld.

Political positions
For the Native Language! supports increased role for Russian language in education and public administration. It also supports changes in Latvian citizenship so that it would be awarded to a large number of non-citizens. Economically, "The 13 January Movement" supported socialism.

See also
 National Bolshevik Party
 2012 Latvian constitutional referendum
 Russians in Latvia
 Non-citizens (Latvia)

References

2012 establishments in Latvia
2016 disestablishments in Latvia
Defunct political parties in Latvia
National Bolshevik parties
Political parties disestablished in 2016
Political parties established in 2012
Russian language
Russian nationalism in Latvia
Russian nationalist parties
Russian political parties in Latvia
Socialist parties in Latvia